Streptomyces chilikensis is a halophilic and alkali tolerant bacterium species from the genus of Streptomyces which has been isolated from brackish water sediment from the Chilika Lake in Chandrapur in the Khurdha district of Odisha in India.

See also 
 List of Streptomyces species

References

Further reading

External links
Type strain of Streptomyces chilikensis at BacDive -  the Bacterial Diversity Metadatabase

chilikensis
Bacteria described in 2013